Attila Simon (born 4 February 1983) is a Hungarian professional footballer who plays as a forward for Taksony SE.

Career
Simon joined Újpest FC from Diósgyőri VTK in May 2008.

He became top scorer in the 2013–14 season of the Hungarian League alongside Videoton striker Nemanja Nikolić with 18 goals each.

He moved to Dorogi of the Nemzeti Bajnokság II in January 2017.

References

External links
 Profile 
 
 

1983 births
Living people
Footballers from Budapest
Hungarian footballers
Association football forwards
Nemzeti Bajnokság I players
Nemzeti Bajnokság II players
Austrian Football Bundesliga players
BKV Előre SC footballers
Soroksári TE footballers
Diósgyőri VTK players
Újpest FC players
Kecskeméti TE players
Zalaegerszegi TE players
BFC Siófok players
Paksi FC players
Pécsi MFC players